Nolan Sisters is a 1979 album by the Irish sibling pop group the Nolan Sisters. It was their first album to be released on Epic Records and contained a mixture of original material (composed for the group by Ben Findon, Mike Myers, and Robert Puzey) and cover versions of popular songs. Two singles, "Spirit Body and Soul" and "I'm In the Mood for Dancing", were released from the album, the latter becoming the group's best-known song, peaking at No.3 in the UK, while the former was also a top 40 hit. The release of that single also marked a group name change to the Nolans.

The album entered the UK chart in January 1980 and peaked at number 15. It remained on the chart for 13 weeks. In Japan, the album was released under the name Dancing Sisters. The album cover included, as well as the then line-up, Coleen Nolan, who became an official member of the group after Anne left the group in 1980.
 
The album was re-released on Compact Disc in June 2009 with the added bonus track "Harry My Honolulu Lover", which the group had entered into the heats for the 1979 Eurovision Song Contest. Released by Cherry Red Records, it was packaged with the follow-up album, Making Waves.

Track listing

Personnel 
Bernie Nolan - vocals
Linda Nolan - vocals
Maureen Nolan - vocals
Anne Nolan - vocals
Coleen Nolan - additional vocals (tracks 4 and 10)
Ben Findon - producer (tracks 1, 2, 9, 11, 12)
Mike Myers - assistant producer (tracks 1, 2, 9, 11, 12)
Nicky Graham - producer (tracks 4, 5, 6, 7, 8, 10)
Mike Hurst - producer (track 3)
Tim Young - mastering

Chart performance

References

External links 
 
 

1979 albums
The Nolans albums
Epic Records albums